Isoceras kruegeri is a moth in the family Cossidae. It was described by Turati in 1924. It is found in Libya.

References

Natural History Museum Lepidoptera generic names catalog

Cossinae
Moths described in 1924
Moths of Africa